DKD may refer to:

Daniel K Daniel (born 1986), or DKD, a Nigerian actor
Donald K. Tarlton (born 1943), also known as Donald K. Donald, Canadian music promoter and founder of Le Groupe DKD